Kazi Mobin-Uddin  (July 16, 1930 – June 10, 1999) was an American surgeon specializing in vascular surgery research.

Early life 
He was born in British India and educated at the Aligarh Muslim University.

Career 
In 1969 he developed the first Inferior vena cava filter while on faculty at University of Miami for patients with deep vein thrombosis. He published his findings in New England Journal of Medicine and Archives of Surgery. Till then patients with deep vein thrombosis required a high-risk invasive surgical procedure to prevent thrombus embolization to the pulmonary artery. Newsweek magazine reported on the discovery in its October 20, 1969 issue calling it "Umbrella of life." The Mobin-Uddin umbrella was released for general clinical use in 1970.

American College of Chest Physicians has incorporated Inferior vena cava filter into guidelines for management of deep vein thrombosis in their 2012 guidelines. Over 50,000 Inferior vena cava filter are placed in United States each year.

References

1930 births
1999 deaths
Indian expatriates in the United States
American surgeons
Aligarh Muslim University alumni
20th-century surgeons
American physicians of Indian descent